Maggotty Creek is a  long 3rd order tributary to the Stinking River in Pittsylvania County, Virginia.  This is the only stream of this name in the United States.

Course 
Maggotty Creek rises in Natal, Virginia and then flows southeast and then turns southwest to join the Stinking River about 1 mile northeast of Greenfield.

Watershed 
Maggotty Creek drains  of area, receives about 45.3 in/year of precipitation, has a wetness index of 417.64, and is about 49% forested.

See also 
 List of Virginia Rivers

References 

Rivers of Virginia
Rivers of Pittsylvania County, Virginia
Tributaries of the Roanoke River